The Lake Powell Chronicle is a weekly newspaper in Page, Arizona, United States. It has been owned by News Media Corporation since 2005.

References

External links
 Official website

Newspapers published in Arizona
Weekly newspapers published in the United States
Page, Arizona